Shur-e Sofla (also Romanized as Shūr-e Soflá; also known as Shūr-e Pā’īn) is a village in Milanlu Rural District, in the Central District of Esfarayen County, North Khorasan Province, Iran. At the 2006 census, its population was 20, in 4 families.

References 

Populated places in Esfarayen County